Pierre Chauvet may refer to:

 Pierre Chauvet (cross-country skier), French two-time Kilomètre vertical de Fully winner
 Fritz Glatz (1943–2002), Austrian racing driver; also raced under the pseudonym Pierre Chauvet